The Essential Jimi Hendrix Volume Two is a compilation album of songs by American rock musician Jimi Hendrix, released in 1979 by Reprise Records. It is the follow-up album to The Essential Jimi Hendrix, released by Reprise the previous year. 

Some editions in the US, Canada and Italy also contained a 7-inch 33 rpm one-sided EP single of the Jimi Hendrix Experience performing the song "Gloria", which had first been issued with some editions of the first Essential release in the UK, Japan and Italy.

In 1989, the album was combined with its predecessor, The Essential Jimi Hendrix, and issued on compact disc as The Essential Jimi Hendrix Volumes One and Two.

Track listing

 The U.S. cassette edition includes "Gloria" as track six on side one and shifts "Crosstown Traffic" to track one on side two.

Personnel
Jimi Hendrixguitar, vocals
Noel Reddingbass guitar, backing vocals
Mitch Mitchelldrums
Buddy Milesdrums on "Machine Gun"
Billy Coxbass guitar on "Machine Gun", "Star Spangled Banner"

References

External links

1979 greatest hits albums
Compilation albums published posthumously
Jimi Hendrix compilation albums
Warner Records compilation albums
Reprise Records compilation albums